British Air Forces in France (BAFF) was a Royal Air Force (RAF) Command set up on 15 January 1940 under the command of Air Marshal Arthur Barratt, to provide unified command of the RAF in France. The Royal Air Force Component of the British Expeditionary Force (Air Component, Air Vice-Marshal Charles Blount) for air support of the British Expeditionary Force (BEF) and the Advanced Air Striking Force (AASF, Air Vice-Marshal Patrick Playfair) for independent Bomber Command operations from French airfields. Barratt was charged with giving "full assurance" to the BEF of air support and to provide the BEF with

Since the British held only a small part of the Western Front, Barratt must also operate in the context of the immediate needs of the Allies. In France the new arrangement worked well but the War Office and the Air Ministry never agreed on what support should be given to the Field Force of the BEF.

The AASF consisted of RAF light bomber squadrons, based around Rheims in France to be within range of the Ruhr, should the political decision be taken to begin strategic bombing. No decision had been taken before Fall Gelb (Case Yellow), the German offensive in the west, began on 10 May 1940. The AASF bomber force was used instead against the German Army and its lines of communication. BAFF could also request Bomber Command to provide support from medium bombers based in Britain. The headquarters of BAFF were at Chauny next to those of François d'Astier de La Vigerie, the French air commander, to maximise co-operation between the BAFF and the Armée de l'Air. (BAFF HQ moved to Coulommiers, thence to Château Reze, Pornic on 16 June; AASF HQ was based at Château Polignac near Reims, moved to Troyes on 15 May, Muides near Blois on 3 June and Nantes on 10 June. The Air Component HQ was based at Marœuil, moved to Arras 9 May, Hazebrouck 16 May and returned to England on 21/22 May.)

Order of battle, 10 May

BAFF were to be reinforced by four Hurricane squadrons, one to the AASF, when the German offensive started.

10–21 May

BAFF was reinforced by four Hurricane squadrons as planned. The operational instructions issued by BAFF had stated that

The AASF, when used against German troops and bridges, suffered many losses from faulty tactics in the face of the large numbers of Luftwaffe fighters and highly effective light anti-aircraft units protecting the bridges. By the end of 12 May, the number of serviceable bombers with the AASF had been reduced to 72 from 135. The War Cabinet meeting that evening were warned by the Chief of Air Staff Cyril Newall that the bomber losses had been disproportionate to the results achieved. On 14 May, the AASF made a maximum effort against pontoon bridges thrown across the Meuse at Sedan and lost 40 out of 71 aircraft.

German air superiority led to more reinforcement with Hurricane squadrons. At the request of BAFF and the BEF, the equivalent of another two squadrons joined the Air Component on 13 May but this was only after much discussion by the Chiefs of Staff Committee and the War Cabinet. The Chiefs of Staff Committee, meeting in the morning had advised that no further air support could be given on the Continent without unduly weakening the defence of Britain. Churchill, chairing the meeting, asked them to consider further what could be done and raised the matter again at the War Cabinet that evening. The Secretary of State for Air Sir Archibald Sinclair warned that whereas the Air Staff had estimated that 60 fighter squadrons were needed adequately to defend Britain, there were only 39. Churchill later complained of inconsistency of statistics supplied by the Air Staff. Churchill then accepted that it was not possible to send large numbers of fighters to France.

On 14 May, the French Government requested another ten squadrons. This request was discussed first at the Chief of Staffs Committee and then at War Cabinet; both decided against taking any immediate action. The Chief of Staffs Committee of 15 May discussed the matter again; accepted Air Chief Marshal Dowding's advice that sending more fighters would not achieve decisive results in France but would leave Fighter Command too weak to defend Britain and decided against any further reinforcement. That of 16 May had a message from General Maurice Gamelin, asking for ten fighter squadrons at once; if they did not come the battle would be lost. It reconsidered the matter and advised sending eight 'flights' (half-squadrons). This was discussed and agreed at War Cabinet; Churchill wanted to send more squadrons but Sinclair advised that four squadrons was a maximum and even this was a very serious risk, taken contrary to the advice of Dowding.

Churchill flew to Paris for discussions with the French Government and High Command. The discussion was acrimonious, with the French pressing for the full ten squadrons. Churchill urged the need to retain fighters to defend Britain and doubted if six more fighter squadrons would make a difference. The French disagreed, Édouard Daladier asserting that air cover would give French infantry the confidence needed to fight tanks. Paul Reynaud said the Allies had to choose between two risks, leaving English factories without fighter protection, like the French ones or seeing the Germans continue to advance on Paris. Churchill telegraphed the War Cabinet to explain that the situation was "grave in the last degree". Churchill wrote in a telegram from Paris,

The War Cabinet, faced with this, agreed to the French demand. Newall warned that there were only six complete Hurricane squadrons left in the UK and/or advised that Air Component bases could only accommodate another three squadrons. It was agreed that these squadrons were to fly to forward bases in the north of France each day; three in the morning, three in the afternoon. This brought the number of fighter squadrons in the Air Component up to thirteen.

AASF bases and the BAFF headquarters were somewhat to the south of the German advance from Sedan to the Channel coast; the Air Component bases mostly north of it. By 17 May, the landline connections between BAFF and the Air Component had been lost and thereafter the Air Component operated as directed by Lord Gort and the Air Ministry. The German advance up the Channel coast overran Air Component bases, and the Air Component evacuated to southern England from 19 to 21 May. Of the 261 fighters that had operated with the component, only 66 returned to England; 120 of the lost aircraft had suffered damage which under normal circumstances would have been repairable.

22 May – 22 June
The Air Component, renamed the Back Component, no longer controlled any combat aircraft but its headquarters was used to co-ordinate RAF operations from English bases in support of the BEF and the Dunkirk evacuation; during the nine days the evacuation flew over 2,700 fighter sorties. The AASF and Barratt remained in France, retreating first to the Troyes area (16 May), then to the Orléans—Le Mans area (3 June).

The provision of further reinforcements was discussed at the highest political levels, referred to by Churchill in his "This was their finest hour" speech of 18 June,

On 3 June, the War Cabinet discussed what the policy should be on sending further fighter squadrons to support the French. They accepted the advice of the Chiefs of Staff Committee that no more than six bomber squadrons and three fighter squadrons should be based in France. Dowding supported this by noting that serviceable fighter strength in the UK was 224 Hurricanes and 280 Spitfires, warning that this meant that if the Germans were to mount a heavy attack on the UK, he could not guarantee air superiority for more than 48 hours. Sinclair added that the RAF was running short of fighter pilots and this was now the limiting factor. Churchill reopened the discussion on 4 June, noting that the Air Defence of Great Britain now had 45 fighter squadrons and that according to Lord Beaverbrook (the Minister of Aircraft Production) there were more aircraft in Britain than before the start of the German offensive. Beaverbrook then gave more detailed figures for the period 19 May – 1 June: The War Cabinet had been told that French aircraft losses were running at 37 per day, with ten aircraft per day being produced domestically and imports from America averaging eight per day.

Sinclair countered that Fighter Command needed to recover its efficiency as well as its numerical strength; the squadrons were greatly disorganised and many of their finest leaders had been lost; Churchill did not press the matter further. On 5 June the Germans attacked the French line on the Somme; the French repeated their request for British fighter squadrons, asking for ten squadrons immediately, to be followed by another ten as soon as possible. Two Hurricane squadrons were sent to join the AASF (7 May) and four UK-based squadrons operated each day from aerodromes near Rouen, returning to Britain every night.

At the Defence Committee of 8 June Churchill argued that whereas the battle for France was important it would not be decisive; maintaining adequate fighter defences for the UK would be decisive. The Committee unanimously agreed with Churchill's conclusion that it would be fatal to yield to the French demands and jeopardise the safety of the UK. No further squadrons were sent and the AASF moved again to bases around the mouth of the Loire, eventually returning to the UK from 15 to 18 June. Large numbers of RAF personnel were evacuated by sea from various French ports in Operation Aerial. An unknown number of them were lost off St Nazaire on 17 June, when the troopship HMT Lancastria was bombed and sunk by the Luftwaffe. An estimated 800 RAF men had been sent down into the ship's holds, which were penetrated by three German bombs.

Notes

Footnotes

References

Further reading

External links
 

Military units and formations established in 1940
Military units and formations of the Royal Air Force in World War II
France–United Kingdom military relations